Silver Creek High School may refer to:

 Silver Creek High School (Longmont, Colorado)
 Silver Creek High School (San Jose, California)
 Silver Creek High School (Sellersburg, Indiana)
 Silver Creek High School (Silver Creek, New York)